Thomas Guldhammer (born 31 July 1987) is a Danish former professional cyclist. His brother Rasmus Guldhammer also competed professionally as a cyclist.

Major results

2005
 1st Trofeo Emilio Paganessi
 National Junior Road Championships
2nd Time trial
2nd Road race
 2nd Overall Grand Prix Rüebliland
1st Stage 1
 3rd Overall Grand Prix Général Patton
2007
 3rd Fyen Rundt
 4th Duo Normand
2008
 1st Stage 2 Boucle de l'Artois
2009
 8th GP Herning
 10th Paris-Roubaix Espoirs
2010
 2nd Skive–Løbet
 7th Fyen Rundt
2011
 6th Himmerland Rundt
2012
 1st Stage 4 Randers Bike Week

References

External links

1987 births
Living people
Danish male cyclists
People from Vejle Municipality
Sportspeople from the Region of Southern Denmark